The Yacoraite Formation is a largely Mesozoic geologic formation. The deposits of this formation mainly date from the Maastrichtian of the Upper Cretaceous, but the Cretaceous–Paleogene boundary (K–T boundary) runs right through this formation near its top, and the uppermost parts are consequently from the Danian (Lower Paleocene). It was probably deposited around the intertidal zone, as the sedimentary rocks of this formation alternate according to sea level changes between deposits of muddy beaches and of shallow ocean.

Fossil content 
Dinosaur remains are among the fossils that have been recovered from the formation.

Well-preserved dinosaur footprints assigned to Hadrosaurichnus australis have been found in this formation, as were fossil eggs, stromatolites and the Mesozoic palynomorph Aquilapollenites. 

Other fossils recovered from the formation are:
 Pucapristis branisi
 Gasteroclupea branisai
 Coelodus toncoensis
 Dolichochampsa minima

Ichnofossils
 Hadrosaurichnus australis
 Salfitichnus mentoor
 Taponichnus donottoi
 Telosichnus saltensis
 Yacoraitichnus avis

See also 
 List of dinosaur-bearing rock formations
 List of stratigraphic units with indeterminate dinosaur fossils

References

Bibliography 
 
 
 

Geologic formations of Argentina
Upper Cretaceous Series of South America
Cretaceous Argentina
Maastrichtian Stage of South America
Cretaceous–Paleogene boundary
Paleocene Series of South America
Paleogene Argentina
Danian Stage
Sandstone formations
Limestone formations
Deltaic deposits
Ichnofossiliferous formations
Formations
Fossiliferous stratigraphic units of South America
Paleontology in Argentina
Geology of Jujuy Province
Geology of Salta Province